Tetyana Ryabchenko (born 28 August 1989) is a Ukrainian racing cyclist, who most recently rode for Turkish amateur team Mega Saray.

Major results

2011
 1st  Road race, National Road Championships
 UEC European Under-23 Road Championships
7th Road race
10th Time trial
2013
 1st Tour of Chongming Island World Cup
 6th Overall Giro della Toscana Int. Femminile – Memorial Michela Fanini
 7th Overall Tour of Zhoushan Island
2014
 National Road Championships
1st  Road race
1st  Time trial
 6th Grand Prix GSB
 7th Overall Giro della Toscana Int. Femminile — Memorial Michela Fanini
 7th Grand Prix el Salvador
 8th Overall Vuelta a El Salvador
 9th Overall Trophée d'Or Féminin
 10th Grand Prix de Oriente
2015
 National Road Championships
1st  Road race
2nd Time trial
 4th Overall Trophée d'Or Féminin
1st Mountains classification
 5th Overall La Route de France
 6th Overall Emakumeen Euskal Bira
 6th Giro dell'Emilia Internazionale Donne Elite
 10th Durango-Durango Emakumeen Saria
2016
 1st Horizon Park Women Challenge
 National Road Championships
2nd Road race
3rd Time trial
 2nd VR Women ITT
 7th Overall Tour Cycliste Féminin International de l'Ardèche
2017
 National Road Championships
2nd Road race
3rd Time trial
 5th VR Women ITT
2018
 1st  Mountains classification Panorama Guizhou International Women's Road Cycling Race
 3rd Overall Giro della Toscana Int. Femminile – Memorial Michela Fanini
 4th Overall Tour of Eftalia Hotels & Velo Alanya
 5th Overall Tour of Zhoushan Island
 7th VR Women ITT
 9th Ljubljana–Domžale–Ljubljana TT
2019
 2nd Time trial, National Road Championships
 2nd VR Women ITT
 4th Grand Prix Velo Alanya
 6th Overall Vuelta a Burgos Feminas
 7th Time trial, European Games
2020
 4th Grand Prix Manavgat-Side
 7th Grand Prix Velo Alanya

References

External links

1989 births
Living people
Ukrainian female cyclists
Place of birth missing (living people)
Cyclists at the 2015 European Games
European Games competitors for Ukraine
Cyclists at the 2019 European Games